This is a list of the brightest natural objects in the sky. This list orders maximum apparent magnitudes from Earth, not anywhere else. This list is meant for naked eye viewing; all objects are listed by their visual magnitudes, and objects too close together to be distinguished are listed jointly. Objects are listed by their proper names or their most commonly used stellar designation. This list does not include transient objects such as comets, man-made objects, supernovae or clouds.

List

Non-visual magnitudes

See also 

 Apparent magnitude
 Bayer designation
 Extraterrestrial sky
 Historical brightest stars
 List of brightest stars
 List of nearest bright stars
 List of nearest stars and brown dwarfs

Notes

References

Citations

Sources 

 
 

Brightest
Stars, List of Brightest
Stars, brightest